Thurmon Travis Hackworth (born June 5, 1975) is an American businessman and politician, serving as a member of the Virginia Senate from the 38th district. A member of the Republican Party, he took office on April 2, 2021.

Hackworth is a businessman from Richlands, Virginia, and serves on the Tazewell County Board of Supervisors. The members elected him chair of the board in January 2019. He won the special election to represent Virginia's 38th Senate district in the Virginia Senate, following the death of Ben Chafin, with 76% of the vote on March 23, 2021.

Hackworth petitioned the Supreme Court of Virginia to prevent the state's redistricting commission from using a new state law to draw the legislative maps. The law changed how prisoners are counted in the population, as they were previously counted at their incarcerated address, but are now counted by their last known address. The state Supreme Court dismissed the petition in an order issued September 22, 2021.

In December 2021, Hackworth introduced a bill to the State Senate that would rescind requirements that schools follow Virginia Department of Education guidelines on equal treatment of transgender students. The bill, which faced strong opposition from trans rights advocates, was voted down in committee.

References

External links

Living people
Republican Party Virginia state senators
People from Tazewell County, Virginia
1975 births
21st-century American politicians